Zheng Qinwen (born  8 October 2002) is a Chinese tennis player. She reached a career-high singles ranking of world No. 24, on 13 February 2023. She is the current No. 1 Chinese player. Zheng was named the 2022 WTA Newcomer of the Year.

Junior career
Zheng left home when she was eight to train in Wuhan, and was soon inspired by Li Na's run to the 2011 French Open title. She later trained with Li's former coach Carlos Rodriguez in Beijing.

Junior Grand Slam results - Singles:
 Australian Open: 2R (2019)
 French Open: SF (2019)
 Wimbledon: 3R (2018, 2019)
 US Open: SF (2019)

Junior Grand Slam results - Doubles:
 Australian Open: 2R (2018)
 French Open: QF (2019)
 Wimbledon: 1R (2018, 2019)
 US Open: QF (2018)

Professional career

2021: WTA debut, top 150
In January 2021, she won the Tennis Future Hamburg, Germany where she defeated Linda Fruhvirtová, 6–2, 6–3 in the final of the $25k ITF Circuit event, held at the venue of the Hamburger Tennis-Verband.

On 20 June 2021, she won the final of the $60k Macha Lake Open in Staré Splavy, defeating Aleksandra Krunić in two sets.

Zheng made her WTA Tour debut at the Palermo Ladies Open, where she also recorded her first win defeating second seed Liudmila Samsonova in the first round.

2022: Major debut & fourth round, first WTA final & top 25 debut
At the Melbourne Summer Set 1, she reached her first WTA semifinal after beating Mai Hontama, former No. 2 Vera Zvonareva, and Ana Konjuh, respectively. She lost her semifinal match to second seed Simona Halep, in straight sets. 

A week after Melbourne Summer Set, Zheng qualified for her first Grand Slam event, at the Australian Open where she defeated Aliaksandra Sasnovich in the first round. In the second, she lost to fifth seed Maria Sakkari, in straight sets. As a result, she reached the top 100 at world No. 80, on 31 January 2022.

At the French Open, she defeated Maryna Zanevska on her debut at this major. Next she defeated former French Open champion and 19th seed, Simona Halep, her first top-20 win, to move to the third round of a major for the first time in her career. She moved into the fourth round after Alizé Cornet's retirement. On 30 May 2022, she lost to top seed and world No. 1, Iga Świątek of Poland, in the fourth round, referring to menstrual cramps as a contributing factor. Zheng was still happy about her performance and glad that she was able to play against the world's number one. As a result, she moved to a new career-high of No. 54, on 6 June 2022, and reached the top 50 at world No. 46 a week later when she won her first WTA 125 title at the Open de Valencia defeating compatriot Wang Xiyu.

She debuted at Wimbledon and defeated Sloane Stephens in the first round. She won her second match at this major against Greet Minnen, before falling to the eventual champion, Elena Rybakina, in the third round.

In August, Zheng defeated fifth seed Ons Jabeur by retirement for her first top-10 win in the second round and Bianca Andreescu in the third round of the Canadian Open to enter the first WTA 1000 quarterfinal of her career, in which she lost to Karolína Plíšková, in three sets. At the US Open, Zheng defeated Jeļena Ostapenko in the first round and Anastasia Potapova in the second. She was beaten in the third round by Jule Niemeier, in straight sets.

At the Pan Pacific Open in Japan, she became the first Chinese teenager to ever reach a WTA Tour final which she lost to Liudmila Samsonova. Her win over top seed Paula Badosa in the second round was her first completed top-10 win and second overall (after Jabeur in Toronto). She also became the second teenager to make a WTA 500-level or higher final in the season after Coco Gauff. As a result, she reached the top 30 at world No. 28 on 26 September 2022, becoming the first Chinese teenager to do so.

2023
Zheng began 2023 with a win over former world No. 2 player Anett Kontaveit in the first round of the Adelaide International, surviving match points in the third set to triumph in a final set tiebreak, but lost to Victoria Azarenka in the second.

Performance timelines

Only main-draw results in WTA Tour, Grand Slam tournaments, Fed Cup/Billie Jean King Cup and Olympic Games are included in win–loss records.

Singles
Current after the 2023 Dubai Open.

Doubles

WTA career finals

Singles: 1 (runner-up)

WTA Challenger finals

Singles: 1 (title)

ITF Circuit finals

Singles: 8 (8 titles)

ITF Junior Circuit finals

Singles: 8 (5 titles, 3 runner–ups)

Record against other players

Record against top 10 players 

 She has a  record against players who were, at the time the match was played, ranked in the top 10.

Double bagel matches (6–0, 6–0)

Win without dropping a single game

Notes

References

External links
 
 

2002 births
Living people
Chinese female tennis players
Sportspeople from Wuhan
21st-century Chinese women